In chemistry, linkage isomerism or ambidentate isomerism is a form of isomerism in which certain coordination compounds have the same composition but differ in their metal atom's connectivity to a ligand.

Typical ligands that give rise to linkage isomers are:
thiocyanate,  – isothiocyanate, 
selenocyanate,  – isoselenocyanate, 
nitrite, 
sulfite, 

Examples of linkage isomers are violet-colored  and orange-colored . The isomerization of the S-bonded isomer to the N-bonded isomer occurs intramolecularly. 

The complex cis-dichlorotetrakis(dimethylsulfoxide)ruthenium(II) exhibits linkage isomerism of dimethyl sulfoxide ligands due to S- vs. O-bonding. Trans-dichlorotetrakis(dimethylsulfoxide)ruthenium(II) does not exhibit linkage isomers.

History
Linkage isomerism was first noted for nitropentaamminecobalt(III) chloride, . This cationic cobalt complex can be isolated as either of two linkage isomers. In the yellow-coloured isomer, the nitro ligand is bound through nitrogen. In the red linkage isomer, the nitrito is bound through one oxygen atom. Although the existence of the isomers had been known since the late 1800s, only in 1907 was the difference explained. It was later shown that the red isomer converted to the yellow isomer upon UV-irradiation. In this particular example, the formation of the nitro isomer from the nitrito isomer occurs by an intramolecular rearrangement.

References

Coordination chemistry
Chemical bonding
Isomerism